Maj.-Gen. Henry Wylie  (24 July 1844 – 5 October 1918) was a British Indian Army officer. He served as the acting Chief Commissioner of Balochistan in 1899 and as British Resident at Nepal, 1891–1900.

Wylie was born in Calcutta, where his father, MacLeod Wylie, was a judge. He died at his home in Farnham Common, Buckinghamshire.

References

External links
 

1844 births
1918 deaths
Indian Political Service officers
British Indian Army officers
Companions of the Order of the Star of India